Anne-Marie Hurst is a singer from Keighley, West Yorkshire.

She was the backing vocalist for the gothic rock groups the Elements (until 1982) and became lead vocalist with the Skeletal Family and Ghost Dance. In December 1982, she helped form Skeletal Family. After departing from Skeletal Family in 1985, she co-founded Ghost Dance with Gary Marx (formerly of the Sisters of Mercy).

Hurst released her first solo album, Day of All Days, in 2011 on Jungle Records.

References

External links

Year of birth missing (living people)
Living people
English women singers
Gothic rock musicians
Women punk rock singers
People from Keighley